Der Sozialdemokrat was a German socialist publication. It was founded by Jean Baptista von Schweitzer. The first issue was published in Zurich on 28 September 1867.

Due to the Anti-Socialist Laws, the publication had to be distributed illegally into Germany. It was printed in London from 1887.

References

Newspapers established in 1867
German-language newspapers published in Switzerland
Newspapers published in London
Newspapers published in Zürich
Defunct newspapers published in Switzerland
Socialism in Switzerland
Socialist newspapers